The Piney River is an  river in the U.S. state of Virginia. Rising in the northern part of Shenandoah National Park, it is a tributary of the Thornton River, and via the Hazel and Rappahannock rivers is part of the Chesapeake Bay watershed.

See also
List of rivers of Virginia

References

Rivers of Virginia
Tributaries of the Rappahannock River